This is a list of European Conservatives and Reformists members of the European Parliament.  The European Conservatives and Reformists (ECR) was founded in June 2009, and currently has 62 members in the European Parliament.

List of members in 8th European Parliament (2014–2019)
Members' places of birth are in their respective countries that they represent unless otherwise indicated by a national flag next to the stated place of birth.

Former members
The party denoted is the party for whom the MEP was elected.

References

European Parliament
Conservatism-related lists